Heaven's Bright Sun is a live progressive rock album by Iona, released in 1997.

Recordings were made under engineer Nigel Palmer by the B-I-H mobile 'Live' in England during December 1996, at the Irish Centre, Leeds, the Q Club, Birmingham, and The Amulet, Shepton Mallet.

Personnel
Joanne Hogg - vocals, acoustic guitar, keyboards, shaker
Dave Bainbridge - guitars, keyboards
Phil Barker - bass guitar
Terl Bryant - drums, percussion
Troy Donockley - Uillean pipes, low whistles, tin whistle, guitars, e-bow slide guitar, keyboards, cittern, vocals
Mike Haughton - saxophone, flute, tin whistle, vocals, tambourine

Track listing
Disc 1 - total time 48:39
"Turning Tide" – 2:23
"Treasure" – 4:56
"Flight of the Wild Goose" – 5:42
"Today" – 3:29
"Irish Day" – 6:11
"Luke" – 3:45
"Inside My Heart" – 6:51
"Trilogy" – 8:47
"I Will Give My Love an Apple" – 6:35
Disc 2 - Total Time 62:42
The Island – 5:55
Iona – 6:39
Columcille – 4:14
Heaven's Bright Sun – 7:54
Chi-Rho – 5:04
Bi-Se I Mo Shuil Part 2 – 4:48
Kells Theme – 6:28
Reels – 7:34
When I Survey – 14:06

Release details
1997, UK, Alliance Records ALD 092, release date January 1997, CD
1997, UK, Alliance Records ALC 092, release date January 1997, cassette
1997, USA, Forefront Records FFD-5178, release date January 1997, CD
2005, UK, Open Sky Records OPENVP7CD, release date 13 June 2005, CD

Iona (band) albums
1997 live albums